(the German form of Latin naenia, meaning "a funeral song" named after the Roman goddess Nenia) is a composition for SATB chorus and orchestra, Op. 82 by Johannes Brahms, which sets to music the poem "" by Friedrich Schiller. Brahms composed the piece in 1881, in memory of his deceased friend Anselm Feuerbach. Nänie is a lamentation on the inevitability of death; the first sentence, "", translates to "Even the beautiful must die". Typical duration of a performance is approximately 15 minutes.

Poem 
Schiller's lament is not for a specific person but the death of the abstract "beautiful" ("Das Schöne"). Schiller mentions three episodes from Greek mythology, but again mostly without names, assuming that the reader with knowledge will make the connections. The first episode refers to Orpheus who tries to rescue Eurydice from the underworld, the second refers to Aphrodite's mourning of her lover Adonis, the third refers to the failed effort of Thetis to save her son Achilles from death.

Setting by Brahms 

Brahms began his composition in spring 1880 as a response to the death of his friend, the painter Anselm Feuerbach. He chose the text referring to the frequent motifs from Greek mythology in the painter's work. Brahms completed the composition in the summer of 1881 and dedicated it to Henriette Feuerbach, the painter's stepmother. Written about a decade after Ein deutsches Requiem, it shows a similar approach of consolation of those who mourn a death.

Other compositions 
A setting of the text by Hermann Goetz, written in 1874, is also extant and has been recorded.

References

External links
Nänie: Free scores at the Brahms Institut.

, University of Memphis Chamber Orchestra and University Singers, April 2011

Compositions by Johannes Brahms
Choral compositions
Funerary and memorial compositions
1881 compositions
Works by Friedrich Schiller